Kannodu Kanbathellam is a 1999 Indian Tamil-language romantic thriller film written and directed by Prabhu Solomon in his directorial debut. The film has Arjun and Sonali Bendre, while Suchindra, Ruchita Prasad, Manivannan, Crazy Mohan, Anu Mohan, Kovai Sarala and Nizhalgal Ravi portray supporting roles. Music was composed by Deva. The film was released in August 1999. The film's name is based on a song from Tamil film Jeans (1998).

Plot
Seetharam is a well-respected businessman who lives with his PA Muthuswamy in Chennai. Although being a short-tempered and tense person, Seetharam is good at heart and helps people in need. He soon meets and falls in love with Kalyani. After a couple of meetings she sees his good nature and falls in love with him.

But, Seetharam faces problems in the form of another loving couple, Akash and Akhila due to an argument between Akhila and Akash and Akhila acts as Seetharam's fiancé so that she can get rid of Akash just before he proposes to Kalyani. Kalyani, being innocent and gullible, believes her words and goes away from Seetharam. An enraged and betrayed Seetharam therefore seeks revenge against Akash and Akhila by trying to separate them. But, he fails in all of his attempts. He also attempts to stop the love marriage between Akash and Akhila, which is arranged by Madana Gopal, Akash's father.

Akash and Akhila meet Seetharam and apologises to him, but Seetharam adamantly refuses to forgive them and sends goons to kill them. Later, Seetharam is shocked to see Kalyani at a shopping mall and learns that she is married to a blind man, Rajasheker. She tells him that, after they broke up, she was struggling with crippling depression and Rajasheker was the beacon of light that saved her from this darkness. She says that even though her husband is blind, she is content with her life now. Kalyani's husband tells Seetharam that God gave him a wonderful wife, in place of hos lost eyes. An emotionally distraught Seetharam wishes them "Best of Luck", and they invite Seetharam to their home. Seetharam, now a changed man, saves Akash and Akhila from the goons, who had never seen Seetharam in person and is not aware that he was the one who hired them.

Alternate Climax
After sending goons to kill both Akash and Akhila, Seetharam has a change of heart and decides to save them from the goons. After a prolonged fight with the goons, who are unaware that Seetharam was the one who hired them, Seetharam manages to save Akash and Akhila. He tells the couple the incident that made him change his mind. In a surprising turn of events, he met Kalyani at the airport with her blind brother. She told him that Akash and Akhila met her and apologized for their behaviour and revealed the truth behind the incident with Seetharam. Kalyani's brother requests Seetharam to accept his sister to which Seetharam happily accepts. Finally the movie ends with Seetharam and Kalyani united.

Cast

 Arjun as Seetharam
 Sonali Bendre as Kalyani
 Suchindra as Akash
 Ruchita Prasad as Akhila
 Manivannan as Madana Gopal, Akash's father
 Chinni Jayanth as Akash's friend
 Crazy Mohan as Kalaiselvam, Akhila's father
 Anu Mohan as Muthuswamy, Seetharam's PA
 Kovai Sarala as Akhila's mother
 Nizhalgal Ravi as Thangarajan
 Thalaivasal Vijay as DCP Bharathi, a police officer
 Pandu as Akhila's boss
 Halwa Vasu as a man who asks Madana Gopal to check whether his currency note is original
 Ravi Shanth as Akash's friend
 Balaji as Akash's friend
 Prabhu Solomon as a goon
 Raju Sundaram in a special appearance in the song "Ai Yamma"

Production
Anbalaya Films offered debutant Prabhu Solomon an opportunity to direct a film for their production house, after he had helped them complete the post-production works for Murai Mappillai (1995) when director Sundar C walked out. Prabhu Solomon chose to feature Raghuvaran and Bhanupriya in the leading roles, though the producers Anabalaya Films were reluctant to cast a character artiste in the lead role. Prabhu revealed he met Arjun in Thenkasi during the making of Mudhalvan (1999), at the insistence of his producer and actively tried to make a poor impression. Arjun, nonetheless, was keen and worked on the film.

Soundtrack
Soundtrack was composed by Deva and lyrics were written by Vaali, Kalaikumar, Thamarai and Mayil.

Release and reception
New Straits Times felt that film should have done by "someone more experienced". Kalki wrote that "director who moved the story by giving different touch to love has messed up the climax" but praised Arjun's acting and Deva's music.

Several days after the release of the film, owing to public demand, the climax was changed to show a happier ending where Arjun's character reunites with Sonali Bendre's character.

References

External links 

1999 films
1990s Tamil-language films
Indian romantic thriller films
Films scored by Deva (composer)
1999 directorial debut films
Films directed by Prabhu Solomon
1990s romantic thriller films